Anwar Hussain Laskar (28 December 1964 – 18 July 2022), also known as Rana Bhai, was an Indian politician. He was a member of the Assam Legislative Assembly from 1996 to 2006, elected from Sonai. He was a member of Asom Gana Parishad and later the Samajwadi Party.

References 

1964 births
2022 deaths
All India United Democratic Front politicians
Samajwadi Party politicians
Assam MLAs 2016–2021
People from Hailakandi district
Place of birth missing
21st-century Bengalis
Asom Gana Parishad politicians